The Durgin Bridge is a covered bridge carrying Durgin Bridge Road over the Cold River in eastern Sandwich, New Hampshire.  Built in 1869, it is a rare surviving example of a Paddleford truss bridge, and one of the few surviving 19th-century covered bridges in New Hampshire.  It was listed on the National Register of Historic Places in 1983.

Description and history
The Durgin Bridge is located in an isolated rural area of eastern Sandwich. It spans the Cold River between road junctions with Foss Flats Road and Fellows Hill Road on the south side of the river, and Durgin Bridge Road, Bridge View Road, and River Road on the north side. The bridge rests on concrete-faced stone abutments and is covered by a metal gabled roof.

The bridge was built in 1869 at one of two major crossing points of the Cold River (the other at Whiteface village to the northwest).  This one was located not far from the mill of James Durgin, and eventually came to be known by his name.  It replaced bridges that had been swept away by floods in 1844, 1855, and 1869.  Jacob Berry, the builder, eliminated the central pier used by the earlier bridges, and raised the height of the bridge .  He had previously worked with Peter Paddleford, whose truss design he used for this structure.  The laminated arches were added in 1968–69 to allow for the passage of heavy vehicles, including fire trucks.  It is the only surviving 19th-century covered bridge in Sandwich.

See also

List of New Hampshire covered bridges
List of bridges on the National Register of Historic Places in New Hampshire
National Register of Historic Places listings in Carroll County, New Hampshire
New Hampshire Historical Marker No. 82: Durgin Bridge

References

Covered bridges on the National Register of Historic Places in New Hampshire
Bridges completed in 1869
Bridges in Carroll County, New Hampshire
1869 establishments in New Hampshire
National Register of Historic Places in Carroll County, New Hampshire
Sandwich, New Hampshire
Road bridges on the National Register of Historic Places in New Hampshire
Wooden bridges in New Hampshire
Long truss bridges in the United States